Hansapur may refer to several places in Nepal:

Hansapur, Gandaki, a village development committee in Gorkha District
Hansapur, Kaski, a town and Village Development Committee in Kaski District in the Gandaki Zone
Hansapur, Lumbini, in Arghakhanchi District in the Lumbini Zone
Hansapur, Rapti, a Village Development Committee in Pyuthan, a Middle Hills district of Rapti Zone
Hansapur, Dhanusa, a municipality in Danusha District in Province No. 2